Formed in 1953, the Plains Cotton Cooperative Association is a farmed-owned cooperative effort in the United States.  PCCA distributes its cotton through its computerized trading system, The Seam.

References

Agricultural organizations based in the United States
Cotton industry in the United States